Erupa schoenobina is a moth in the family Crambidae. It was described by George Hampson in 1919. It is found in Peru.

References

Erupini
Moths described in 1919